A model commercial vehicle is a scale model or die-cast toy that represents a commercial vehicle: truck (lorry), bus, etc.

Overview
Like model cars, model commercial vehicles are sold both as kits for the enthusiast to construct and paint and as pre-built, pre-painted collectible models. Model kits may be made in plastic, resin, metal (including white metal), and wood; collectables are usually made of die-cast metal and plastic.  One of the most used alloys is Zamac, a combination of Zinc and Aluminium.  Z.A.M.A.C.: Zinc and Aluminium Metal Alloy Casting.  This material is also known as ZAMAK or Mazak.

History
Winross (Rochester, New York) pioneered 1/64 scale promotional model trucks in the early 1960s.  Other American brands followed suit, including Ertl, SpecCast, Liberty Classics, Hartoy (AHL - American Highway Legends and PEM - Precision Engineered Models), Road Champs, Penjoy, Die Cast Promotions, GearBox, and Tonkin, which took over the AHL and PEM lines following the demise of Hartoy.  In Britain, Lledo made some 1/64 scale lorries in its Vanguards range.  The classic Corgi Routemaster bus is approximately 1/64 scale, too.  Few other companies outside the US have used 1/64 scale for commercial vehicles.

1/76 scale is very popular in Britain and Hong Kong for models of transit buses and coaches (intercity buses).  The EFE (Exclusive First Editions) line, which appeared in 1989, included both buses and trucks.  The models were designed in the UK but manufactured in China.  Most EFE models have been replicas of British vehicles and by 2006 over 1500 different models had been released.

Corgi Classics Limited followed EFE in 1995 with their own Original Omnibus Company (OOC) line of 1/76th scale UK, US, and Hong Kong vehicles, well over 800 models have been produced to date. Other manufacturers such as Britbus and Creative Master Northcord have also entered the UK market with their own lines of bus models since 2002. Trax Models and Creative Master Northcord provide localised 1/76 models to the Australian market.

Explanation of Scale
Enthusiasts may pursue commercial vehicle modeling in its own right or as an adjunct to model railways, where the vehicles add verisimilitude to a layout (for example: trucks in a goods yard; buses at a station).  The most popular diecast scales for commercial vehicles are 1:43 and 1:50, coming from their initial role as props in 0 scale model railway layouts.  While 0 scale has become less popular for trains, its 1:43 scale and 1:50 scale have grown and prospered for diecast commercial vehicles.

Other scales which are popular include 1:64 scale (the same as S scale American Flyer trains), 1/87 (the same as H0 scale trains), and 1/34 (which has no parallel in model railroading).

Outside Britain H0 gauge (1/87) trains are more popular than 00 gauge (1/76).  For that reason 1/76 scale commercial vehicles have less appeal outside the UK, but 1/87 scale trucks are very popular, not only with model railroaders but with truck collectors as well.  Most HO scale trucks are primarily plastic, whereas trucks in other scales tend to be diecast metal, often with some plastic parts.

References

Toy cars and trucks
Scale modeling